The 1931 Oldenburg state election was held on 17 May 1931 to elect the 48 members of the Landtag of the Free State of Oldenburg.

Results

References 

Oldenburg
Elections in Lower Saxony